A labour market area is a spatially coherent area of cities and municipalities that enables meaningful statistics in terms of economic performance and jobs. The delimitation of the geographical area is based on statistical criteria and not on political organisation. A labour market area is defined as a region in which the majority of those employed there also live. The division of a country into labour market areas is widely used in statistical analyses and cartographic representations. The space is subdivided in such a way that spatial and temporal comparisons between units that are as similar as possible are possible. The method uses commuter flows between cities and municipalities as a characteristic. It thus enables uniform criteria for an entire country and is used in several European countries and by the Statistical Office of the European Union (Eurostat). Since settlement and land use of an area change considerably over time, the boundaries of the labour market areas must be revised regularly to ensure that they adequately reflect the current situation.

Germany
In Germany, labour market areas are defined and updated by the Federal Office for Building and Regional Planning. The division of Germany into labour market areas focuses on urban-suburban relations.

Switzerland
In 2018, the Swiss Federal Statistical Office (FSO) defined the labour market areas in Switzerland, a total of 101 labour market areas, which are grouped into 16 major labour market regions. In parallel, a total of ten cross-border labour market regions were designated.

See also
Metropolitan area

References 

Metropolitan areas
Urban geography